Bryan Young Owsley (August 19, 1798 – October 27, 1849) was a United States representative from Kentucky. He was born near Crab Orchard, Kentucky and he attended the common schools of Lincoln County, Kentucky. He studied law and was admitted to the bar and then moved to Jamestown, Kentucky, where he was the clerk of the circuit court in 1827.

Owsley was elected as a Whig to the Twenty-seventh Congress (March 4, 1841 – March 3, 1843) but was an unsuccessful candidate for reelection in 1842 to the Twenty-eighth Congress. After leaving Congress, he was a registrar of the United States land office, with residence in Frankfort, Kentucky 1845–1849. He died in Frankfort in 1849.

Owsley was a first cousin to Governor William Owsley; their fathers, Anthony and William respectively, were brothers.

References

1798 births
1849 deaths
Politicians from Frankfort, Kentucky
People from Lincoln County, Kentucky
People from Jamestown, Kentucky
Whig Party members of the United States House of Representatives from Kentucky
19th-century American politicians